Peter Anieke (2 March 1946 – 20 April 2015) was a Nigerian international footballer. He played as a midfielder.

Career
Anieke grew up in Jos where he played football for St Mulumba's College. In 1965, he joined Plateau United and after the Challenge Cup final against ECN Football Club (Now PHCN) in Lagos, Adebajo, Stationery stores owner became interested in signing him and in the 1967 he joined them. He won the Challenge Cup with Stationary Stores Football Club in 1967 and 1968. His goal scoring exploits earned him  the nickname ‘Eusebio of Africa’.

References

1946 births
2015 deaths
Footballers at the 1968 Summer Olympics
Nigerian footballers
Nigeria international footballers
Olympic footballers of Nigeria
Association football midfielders
Stationery Stores F.C. players
Sportspeople from Jos